The University of Kentucky (UK, UKY, or U of K) is a public land-grant research university in Lexington, Kentucky. Founded in 1865 by John Bryan Bowman as the Agricultural and Mechanical College of Kentucky, the university is one of the state's two land-grant universities (the other being Kentucky State University) and the institution with the highest enrollment in the state, with 30,545 students as of fall 2019.

The institution comprises 16 colleges, a graduate school, 93 undergraduate programs, 99 master programs, 66 doctoral programs, and four professional programs. It is classified among "R1: Doctoral Universities – Very high research activity". According to the National Science Foundation, Kentucky spent $393 million on research and development in 2018, ranking it 63rd in the nation.

The University of Kentucky has fifteen libraries on campus. The largest is the William T. Young Library, a federal depository, hosting subjects related to social sciences, humanities, and life sciences collections. Since 1997, the university has focused expenditures increasingly on research, following a compact formed by the Kentucky General Assembly. The directive mandated that the university become a Top 20 public research institution, in terms of an overall ranking, to be determined by the university itself, by 2020. 2 alumni from the university have won Nobel Prizes.

History

University origins
In the early commonwealth of Kentucky, higher education was limited to children from prominent families, disciplined apprentices, and young men seeking entry into clerical, legal, and medical professions. As the first university in the territory that would become Kentucky, Transylvania University was the primary center for education, and became the forerunner of what would become the University of Kentucky.

John Bryan Bowman founded the Agricultural and Mechanical College of Kentucky (A&M), a publicly chartered department of Kentucky University, after receiving federal support through the Morrill Land-Grant Act in 1865. Courses were offered at Ashland, The Henry Clay Estate. Three years later, James Kennedy Patterson became the first president of the land-grant university and the first degree was awarded. In 1876, the university began to offer master's degree programs. Two years later, A&M separated from Kentucky University, which is now Transylvania University. For the new school, Lexington donated a  park and fair ground, which became the core of UK's present campus. A&M was initially a male-only institution, but began to admit women in 1880.

In 1892, the official colors of the university, royal blue and white, were adopted. An earlier color set, blue and light yellow, was adopted earlier at a Kentucky-Centre College football game on December 19, 1891. The particular hue of blue was determined from a necktie, which was used to demonstrate the color of royal blue.

On February 15, 1882, Administration Building was the first building of three to be completed on the present campus. Three years later, the college formed the Agricultural Experiment Station, which researches issues relating to agribusiness, food processing, nutrition, water and soil resources and the environment. This was followed up by the creation of the university's Agricultural Extension Service in 1910, which was one of the first in the United States. The extension service became a model of the federally mandated programs that were required beginning in 1914.

Coeducational school: modern period

Patterson Hall, the school's first women's dormitory, was constructed in 1904. Residents had to cross a swampy depression, where the now demolished Student Center later stood, to reach central campus. Four years later, the school's name was changed to the "State University, Lexington, Kentucky" upon reaching university status, and then to the "University of Kentucky" in 1916. The university led to the creation of the College of Home Economics in 1916, and Mary E. Sweeney was promoted from chair of the Department of Home Economics to dean of the college. (Later renamed the College of Human Environmental Sciences, this educational unit was folded into the College of Agriculture in 2003 as the School of Human Environmental Sciences). The College of Commerce was established in 1925, known today as the Gatton College of Business and Economics.

In 1929, Memorial Hall was completed, dedicated to the 2,756 Kentuckians who died in World War I. This was followed up by the new King Library, which opened in 1931 and was named for a long-time library director, Margaret I. King.

On March 15, 1948, Lyman T. Johnson applied to the University of Kentucky Graduate School for a doctorate degree in the Philosophy of History. Johnson was subsequently denied admission, with the registrar citing the previously passed Day Law. Johnson, citing Plessy v. Ferguson in 1896 filed suit against the university for wrongful discrimination and failure to maintain equal learning intuitions. On April 27, 1949, Judge Hiram Church Ford presided over the court case. After one day of testimony, Ford determined that the Commonwealth had failed to establish a graduate school with equal opportunity and educational quality as the graduate students offered to whites. Citing the Fourteenth amendment, Ford ruled that all qualified individuals, regardless of race, be allowed to attend the university's graduate program until an equally academically acceptable institution is established for the use of African Americans. Johnson would eventually leave the graduate school before the conclusion of the summer session, and he made it known that his fight was to pave the way for other black students to attend graduate school, not him personally. university's graduate and professional programs became racially integrated in 1949 when Lyman T. Johnson, an African American, won a lawsuit to be admitted to the graduate program. African Americans would not be allowed to attend as undergraduates until 1954, following the US Supreme Court's Brown v. Board of Education decision.

In 1939, Governor Happy Chandler appointed the first woman trustee on the University of Kentucky Board of Trustees, Georgia M. Blazer of Ashland. She served from 1939 to 1960. In 1962, Blazer Hall was opened as the Georgia M Blazer Hall [dormitory] for Women in tribute to her twenty-one years of service as a University of Kentucky trustee.

Ground was broken for the Albert B. Chandler Hospital in 1955, when Kentucky Governor Happy Chandler recommended that the Kentucky General Assembly appropriate $5 million for the creation of the University of Kentucky College of Medicine and a medical center at the university. This was completed after a series of studies were conducted that highlighted the health needs of the citizens, as well as the need to train more physicians for the state. Five years later, the College of Medicine and College of Nursing opened, followed by the College of Dentistry in 1962.

Nine years after the founding of The Northern Extension Center in Covington, representing the Ashland Independent School Board of Education, Ashland attorney Henderson Dysard and Ashland Oil & Refining Company founder and CEO Paul G. Blazer presented a proposal to President Dickey and the University of Kentucky Board of Trustees for the university to take over the day-to-day operations and curriculum of the Ashland [municipal] Junior College, creating the Ashland Center of the University of Kentucky in 1957. University of Kentucky Extension Centers in Fort Knox (1958), Cumberland (1960), and Henderson (1960) followed.

In 1959, the Patterson School of Diplomacy and International Commerce opened and began training professionals at the master's and doctoral level for careers in international affairs. The program was the vision of UK's first president James Kennedy Patterson who had identified the need for the United States to develop a cadre of professionals to advance its diplomatic and commercial interests around the globe. Patterson bequeathed his entire estate to establish this entity.

Authorized by the Kentucky General Assembly and signed by Governor Bert Combs on March 6, 1962, a mandate was placed upon the University of Kentucky to form a community college system. Two years later, the Board of Trustees implemented the legislation and established the Community College System, creating centers in Covington, Ashland, Fort Knox, Cumberland, Henderson and Elizabethtown. In 1969, the Patterson Office Tower was completed, currently the tallest building on campus.

 In May 1970, students at the university began protesting the shootings at Kent State University. In response, Governor Louie Nunn deferred to the National Guard in an attempt to disperse the protesters. An outdated ROTC building was destroyed by fire. The Louie B. Nunn Center for Oral History at the University of Kentucky Libraries has 13 oral history interviews with participants in the protests, university officials as well as former governor Nunn. Nine years later, the Singletary Center for the Arts opened, named in honor of former university president Otis Singletary. In 1979, the University of Kentucky hosted the first Kentucky Women Writers Conference, which is now the longest-running conference of its kind.

Contemporary history

In 1997, the Kentucky General Assembly reorganized the community college system, withdrawing the university's jurisdiction from all but the Lexington Community College. The other colleges were merged with the Kentucky Technical College system and were placed under a separate board of control.

On April 3, 1998, work began on the William T. Young Library, which was the largest university project at the time of completion. The six-level William T. Young Library was constructed on south campus and the largest book endowment among all public university libraries in the country. William T. Young got his fortune from selling his peanut butter company to Procter & Gamble in 1955. Nine years after the completion of the William T. Young Library, on April 13, 2007, an entire city block of neighborhood homes were demolished and ground was broken for the Biological Pharmaceutical Complex Building, the largest academic building in the state of Kentucky, and one of the largest in the United States.

The Biological Pharmaceutical Complex Building complements the adjacent Biomedical Biological Science Research Building, and is expected to be part of the new university research campus. Other recent announcements include the construction of the new $450 million Albert B. Chandler Hospital, which will was one of the largest projects in the state's history in terms of size and economic impact.

In 1997, the Kentucky General Assembly formed a compact with the university. The Top 20 Plan mandates that the University of Kentucky becomes a Top 20 public research university by 2020. According to the compact, states with "Top 20" universities feature higher average household incomes, higher education attainments, healthier lives and more financial security. As a result, fewer citizens live in poverty and as a result, fewer public dollars are spent on health care. The plan would also spur technological advancements due to university-based research and increase the marketability of the state to investors.

As part of the "Top 20" plan, the university stated that it plans to,
 Increase enrollment by 7,000 students to 34,000;
 Increase the state's highest graduation rate by 12% to 72%;
 Increase the number of faculty by 625 to total 2,500;
 Increase research expenditures by $470 million to total $768 million per year; and
 Increase the university's role in Kentucky's "schools, farms, businesses and communities."

The "Top 20" plan has produced some results,
 Total enrollment increased from 24,061 in 1996 to 26,440 in 2004, an increase of 2,379.
 The six-year graduation rate increased from 59.5 percent in 1998 to 61.2 percent in 2007.
 Research expenditures increased from $124.8 million in 1996 to $297.6 million in 2003. It dipped slightly to $274 million for 2005. It is currently ranked 28th among public universities in sponsored research.
 Endowment increased from $195.1 million in 1997 to $538.4 million in 2005.

In 2000, to help finance the "Top 20" plan, the university launched "The Campaign for the University of Kentucky", a $600 million fundraising effort that was used to "enhance facilities, academic programs, public service, and scholarships." It passed that goal and the effort was raised to $1 billion. In March 2007, $1.022 billion was raised, months before the fundraising effort was set to end.

According to the Statewide Facilities Condition Assessment Report released on April 4, 2007, the university needs $12.5 billion to complete the 1997 mandate to become a "Top 20" institution.

As of 2019, The University of Kentucky has an endowment of 1.407 billion. Prior endowments were 831.8 in 2007, $538.4 million in 2005, and $195.1 million in 1997, the rapid increases partially attributed to the "Top 20" Plan. Currently, the William T. Young Library book endowment is the largest among public universities in the United States.

In 2018, the new Gatton Student Center was opened on North Campus. The $200 million, 378,000-square-foot facility contains a cinema, a dining facility, several chain restaurants, ballrooms, the UK Bookstore, the renovated UK Federal Credit Union, offices, and more.

Academics

Departments

Students are divided into 16 colleges, a graduate school, 93 undergraduate programs, 99 master programs, 66 doctoral programs, and four professional programs. The University of Kentucky has fifteen libraries on campus. The largest is William T. Young Library, a federal depository, hosting subjects related to social sciences, humanities and life sciences collections. In recent years, the university has focused expenditures increasingly on research, following a compact formed by the Kentucky General Assembly in 1997. The directive mandated that the university become a Top 20 public research institution, in terms of an overall ranking to be determined by the university itself, by 2020. The university is ranked tied for 132nd in National Universities and tied for 60th among public universities in the 2020 U.S. News & World Report rankings.

Students are divided into several colleges based on their interests and specializations:

College of Agriculture, Food and Environment, founded 1908
College of Arts and Sciences, founded 1908
Gatton College of Business and Economics, founded 1925 (originally as the College of Commerce)
College of Communication & Information, founded 1976
College of Dentistry, founded 1962

College of Design, founded 1964 (originally as the College of Architecture)
College of Education, founded 1923
College of Engineering, founded 1918 (through a merger of the original Colleges of Civil Engineering, Mechanical Engineering, and Mines and Metals)
College of Fine Arts, founded 1976
College of Health Sciences, founded 1966 (originally as the College of Allied Health Personnel)
J. David Rosenberg College of Law, founded 1908
College of Medicine, founded 1954
College of Nursing, founded 1956
College of Pharmacy, founded 1947 (originally established in 1870 in Louisville)
College of Public Health, founded 2004
College of Social Work, founded 1968
University of Kentucky Graduate School, founded 1912
Martin School of Public Policy and Administration
Patterson School of Diplomacy and International Commerce

Other colleges no longer in existence at the University of Kentucky include the College of Library Science (separating out of the College of Arts & Sciences in 1968 and incorporated in 2003 into what is now the College of Communication and Information) and the College of Home Economics (created in 1916 and whose founding dean was Mary E. Sweeney) now a School of Human Environmental Sciences located within the College of Agriculture.

Lewis Honors College

The Honors Program at the University of Kentucky began in 1961. It offers interdisciplinary, seminar-style classes of 15–20 students each as well as "H-section" classes that accelerate common course offerings such as chemistry, biology, and physics. The program is intended to supplement the individual interests of the students. Students are offered priority registration, one-on-one faculty attention, dedicated advising, the opportunity to engage in undergraduate research from their first semesters on campus, and are directed to other programs, including the Chellgren Fellows program, the Gaines Fellowship in the Humanities, the University Scholars Program (which allows simultaneous undergraduate and graduate study), and external scholarship opportunities. Additionally, students are offered assistance with fellowship applications, scholarship applications, study abroad opportunities, Honors designation on transcript and diploma, and/or service learning interests, among other things.

In October 2015, the University of Kentucky received the largest single gift in its history, $23.5 million from alumnus, longtime donor and successful entrepreneur Thomas W. Lewis and his wife Jan to create the Lewis Honors College.

The Lewis Honors College was transitioned from the Honors Program at UK in 2015. From 2017, the Honors Program became the Lewis Honors College. On July 10, 2017, Dr. Christian Brady was announced as the inaugural dean of the college. As of August 2017, construction had been completed on Lewis Hall.

It headquarters are in Lewis Hall, which also serves as one of several residence halls for Honors College students. Lewis houses 2-bedroom suite style rooms for the Honors students. The building also includes classrooms, study spaces, and a small ballroom for programming.

SECU: SEC Academic Initiative

The University of Kentucky is a member of the SEC Academic Consortium. Now renamed the SECU, the initiative was a collaborative endeavor designed to promote research, scholarship and achievement among the member universities in the Southeastern Conference (SEC). The SECU formed its mission to serve as a means to bolster collaborative academic endeavors of SEC universities. Its goals include highlighting the endeavors and achievements of SEC faculty, students and its universities and advancing the academic reputation of SEC universities.

Student life

Students
The University of Kentucky strives for a diverse and international student population, with a selective admissions process.

In fall 2014, there were 30,000 students enrolled for the first time. This is due in part by the high number of out-of-state students. The percentage mix of students at this time were 62% in state and 38% out-of-state. During this time, the freshman class was recorded at 5,000 students.

Student government

The University of Kentucky Student Government Association (UKSGA) represents all undergraduate, graduate and professional students enrolled at the university in several critical ways. UKSGA exists to increase student influence over academic policy and to provide many helpful, creative and necessary student services. UKSGA also exists to protect and expand student substantive and procedural rights with the university and surrounding municipalities. Finally, UKSGA exists to better represent the student body in relations with faculty, administration, Board of Trustees and the Commonwealth of Kentucky.

UKSGA includes an Executive, Legislative, and Judicial Branch.

Executive Branch: oversees day-to-day operations, manages budget, and facilitates major programs.
Legislative Branch: includes the Student Senate. There are 46 legislators in this branch. Their goal is to allocate funds, approve presidential appointments, facilitate legislative changes, and represent the larger student voice.
Judicial: composed of one chief justice and six Supreme Court justices. The Supreme Court rules on the constitutionality of legislation, handles claims levied against SGA officials, hears any election rules violation complaints and validates election results.

Several of their current programs include:

Kentucky Wildcab: a late night transportation service designed to enhance the safety efforts of the university and surrounding community in partnership with UK Transportation.
Wildcat Wardrobe: provides UK students with free professional dress clothing for interviews and jobs
Safe CATS: provides UK students with a safer way to travel around campus by having SafeCats team members escort students to their destinations on-foot or by golf cart
Student Legal Services: free on-site consultation for any legal issue by a local attorney
Childcare Grants: available for part-time and full-time UK students, both at the undergraduate and graduate level, who need financial assistance for day-care service for their children.
Scholarships
Student Organization Funding: General Funding Grants, Club Sports Grants, Service Grants, Academic/Professional Conferences, and Senate Special Projects

Several distinguished student body presidents include Governor Steve Beshear.

Student media

The Electrical and Computer Engineering Department was the home of one of the earliest college amateur radio stations in the United States, beginning with W4JP that began continuous operation prior to World War I. In 1927, the station was relicensed as 9JL (later W9JL).

Students currently run two independent FM stations. The first, 91.3 FM WUKY, is a Triple-A station and was the first university-owned FM radio station in the United States and Kentucky's first public radio station. The operations started on October 17, 1940, as WBKY out of Beattyville, although the station moved five years later to Lexington.

In 1971, WBKY was one of the first to carry NPR's "All Things Considered" and helped debut National Public Radio, changing its call letters to WUKY in 1989 to better reflect its affiliation with the university. In 2007, it became the first Lexington radio station to broadcast in high-definition digital radio. The second is 88.1 FM WRFL which has been in operation since 1988. WRFL is operated by students and broadcasts live 24 hours a day, 7 days a week, and features music that is spread across most genres.

The campus is also served by the Kentucky Kernel, a student-run, financially independent daily newspaper, with the first issue published in 1915. The official yearbook of the University of Kentucky is the Kentuckian, first published in 1906. The Kentuckian was preceded by at least one previous book, the Echo.

Black Student Union

The University of Kentucky Black Student Union (BSU) was established on February 17, 1968. They were the first organization on campus that was created to support and protect students of color. Their goal was to fight for change on campus for diverse students. They work closely with other organizations on campus such as the Student Activities Board, Student Government Association and various fraternities. Their main mission is to educate the campus community on Black American students and to assist incoming minority students.

Jim Embry, born in Richmond, Kentucky, was the founding member of the organization, as well as, the first elected president. 51 years later, Embry is still fighting for progress in the social injustices and systemic racism on campus.

Greek life

Nineteen sororities and twenty-three fraternities serve the university, representing over 3,000 students with a budget of $3.2 million per year. The governing bodies include the National Pan-Hellenic Council, an organization for nine historically black organizations, international Greek assemblies, the National Panhellenic Conference for sororities and the Interfraternity Council for the fraternities.
There are many non-Greek organizations on campus, like Alpha Kappa Psi, an internationally recognized Professional Business Fraternity and Tau Beta Sigma, a band fraternity. The university also hosts a chapter of the Alpha Phi Omega co-educational service fraternity. Farmhouse's chapter was suspended in 2021 for 4 years by the university, after a pledge died while attending a party in the fraternity's house.

Athletics

University of Kentucky student-athletes compete as the Wildcats under colors Kentucky blue and white.

Beginning in the 1890s, students at the A&M scheduled football games with neighboring colleges. In 1902, the women's basketball program began on campus, and the men's team was added one year later. The "Wildcats" became associated with the university shortly after a football victory over Illinois on October 9, 1909. The then-chief of the military department, Commandant Carbuiser, stated that the team had "fought like wildcats." The slogan was later adopted by the university, and a costumed mascot debuted in 1976.

In 1930, then-high school coach Adolph Rupp was hired as a basketball coach for the university. He had a career that would span 42 years until 1972. During his tenure, he led the men's basketball team to four NCAA championships in 1948, 1949, 1951 and 1958. The Wildcats later won a fifth championship under Joe B. Hall in 1978, another in 1996 under Rick Pitino and the next under Orlando "Tubby" Smith in 1998. In 2007, the University of Kentucky named Billy Gillispie as the head coach of the men's basketball team and on March 30, 2009, the university named John Calipari as the head coach of the Wildcats. Calipari coached the team to its eighth national title in 2012.

On December 21, 2009, the men's basketball team reached another milestone, becoming the first college basketball team to reach 2000 all-time wins. The 2000th win was an 88–44 victory over the Drexel Dragons. Kentucky was also the first school to reach the 1000 all-time wins, which they accomplished in 1969.

The university boasts of numerous national championships, with its latest coming in 2012 when the men's basketball team won its eighth national title. UK also boasts of a cross country national team championship (women's, 1988), eight individual championships in gymnastics, an Olympic medalist in track and field, and 24 national championships in cheerleading. (Not an NCAA recognized championship) After defeating number-one ranked Oklahoma 13–7 in the Sugar Bowl under legendary coach Bear Bryant, Kentucky was also a co-national champion for the 1950 season.

The University of Kentucky Dance team is currently ranked 5th in the nation in Hip Hop and 7th in Pom at Universal Dance Association. These are not NCAA recognized championships.

Other athletic programs sponsored at the varsity level include baseball, men's and women's basketball, men's and women's cross country running, football, men's and women's golf, women's gymnastics, the coeducational sport of rifle, men's and women's soccer, women's softball, men's and women's swimming and diving, men's and women's tennis, men's and women's track and field and women's volleyball. The school also has a popular club-level men's ice hockey team and a rugby program that competes at the Division 1 level.

The University of Kentucky football coach is Mark Stoops, named the successor to Joker Phillips, who was the first African American football coach in Kentucky's history.

Notable among a number of songs commonly played and sung at various events such as commencement, convocation and athletic games is the University of Kentucky fight song: On, On, U of K. Additionally, the song Kentucky Fight is played before games.

Esports
University of Kentucky partnered up with South Korean Esport Organisation Gen.G Esports and International Studies Abroad (ISA) to launch an international esports exchange programme in Seoul, South Korea.

Campus

The University of Kentucky offers seven main dining facilities, 23 residence halls, and numerous recreation facilities spread between three distinct campuses: north, south, and central. It is also home to more than 250 student-run organizations.

The university campus is home to numerous notable structures, such as Main Building, a four-story administration building dating to 1882, which was gutted by fire on May 15, 2001. The cause of the blaze was attributed to a welders torch during repairs to the building's roof. Total costs for reconstruction after the fire exceeded $17 million. The Patterson Office Tower is the tallest building on campus. The university is also home to several major construction projects, including the Albert B. Chandler Hospital expansion. As of 2016, construction projects include Student Center renovation and expansion, and Alumni Gym.

The University of Kentucky once operated 14 community colleges with more than 100 extended sites, centers and campuses under the Kentucky Community and Technical College System, but relinquished control under the Postsecondary Education Improvement Act of 1997. The network of community colleges is now known as the Kentucky Community and Technical College System (KCTCS). Adjoining Lexington Community College, despite the reorganization of the community colleges, remained integrated with the university, but separated from the University of Kentucky in 2004 and became a part of KCTCS; it is now known as Bluegrass Community and Technical College.

The College of Engineering currently operates a satellite campus in Paducah, located on the campus of West Kentucky Community and Technical College.

Campus libraries

The University of Kentucky is home to nine campus libraries. Among them is the William T. Young Library, which houses a general undergraduate collection and social sciences, humanities, business, biology, and agricultural materials. The library is also a Federal Depository Library and a public library for the Commonwealth of Kentucky.

Campus landmarks

The University of Kentucky has several noteworthy landmarks:

Kroger Field
Memorial Coliseum
Memorial Hall
Singletary Center for the Arts
University of Kentucky Art Museum
University of Kentucky/Lexington-Fayette Urban County Government Arboretum
University of Kentucky Research and Education Center Botanical Garden
William T. Young Library

Notable faculty

Kimberly W. Anderson, Chemist, Gill Eminent Professor of Chemical Engineering and Associate Dean for Administration and Academic Affairs in the College of Engineering
John Clubbe, expert on Byron, Guggenheim Fellow
Arthur G. Hunt, American plant and soils scientist
Melynda Price, Professor of Law, Director of African American and Africana Studies Program in the College of Arts and Sciences
Ronald Werner-Wilson (born 1962), Chair of the Family Studies Department and Kathryn Louise Chellgren Endowed Professor for Research in Family Studies

Notable alumni

The university has more than 140,246 alumni in the state of Kentucky, 216,737 in the United States, and 1,119 internationally. The University of Kentucky Alumni Association is the primary affiliation for former students and faculty, and is located at the corner of Rose Street and Euclid Avenue. The building, dedicated in 1963, is named for Helen G. King, the first permanent director of the association and a former "Miss University of Kentucky". The association also meets at Spindletop Hall, a large mansion along Iron Works Pike, which serves as a central alumni gathering point.

The University of Kentucky boasts seven governors, including four former Governors of Kentucky: Steve Beshear, Ernie Fletcher, Paul E. Patton, and Albert "Happy" Chandler; Chandler was also a former U.S. Senator, and was the Commissioner of Major League Baseball from 1945 to 1951. Rounding out the other seven are the former Governor of Ohio Ted Strickland, former Governor of North Carolina Beverly Perdue, and former Governor of Arkansas Tom Jefferson Terral. Former U.S. Representative Ken Lucas from the commonwealth's fourth congressional district, and current U.S. Senator Mitch McConnell are other government officials that called the university home. Kelly Craft (née Guilfoil), former United States Ambassador to the United Nations and United States Ambassador to Canada, attended the university.

The United Methodist Bishop Alfred W. Gwinn also attended the university.

Carol Martin “Bill” Gatton, an automobile dealer executive, was the donor of the largest gift ever to the university, and is the namesake for the Gatton College of Business and Economics and the Gatton Student Center. Paul Chellgren, Chairman and CEO of Ashland Inc., also attended the university, and is the namesake for Chellgren Hall, formerly known as Woodland Glen I.

The university was also the home of Dr. Thomas Hunt Morgan, a scientist and winner of the 1933 Nobel Prize in Physiology or Medicine, and William Lipscomb, 1976 winner of the Nobel Prize in Chemistry. Doris Yvonne Wilkinson was the first African American to graduate from the university as an undergraduate student in 1958, and Joyce Hamilton Berry, a former clinical psychologist, was the first female African American to earn a Ph.D. from UK in 1970.

Journalist and Miss USA 2021 Elle Smith also attended the university.

Actresses such as Miss Elizabeth, Ashley Judd, and Adunni Ade also attended the university. Randall Cobb, a wide receiver for the Green Bay Packers, Josh Allen, a defensive end for the Jacksonville Jaguars, Anthony Davis, a power forward and center for Los Angeles Lakers, and Derek Bryant, a former outfielder for the Oakland Athletics from 1973 to 1981, are a few sports alumni from the university. Tyrese Maxey is a point guard for the 76ers.

See also

List of forestry universities and colleges

Notes

References

External links

University of Kentucky Athletics website
Digitized images of the University of Kentucky from the Glass plate negative collection, 1898–1918 housed at the University of Kentucky Libraries Special Collections Research Center

 
Land-grant universities and colleges
Educational institutions established in 1865
Flagship universities in the United States
Universities and colleges accredited by the Southern Association of Colleges and Schools
Universities and colleges in Lexington, Kentucky
Distance education institutions based in the United States
Public universities and colleges in Kentucky
1865 establishments in Kentucky